Ch'iyara Ch'iyara (Aymara ch'iyara black, the reduplication indicates that there is a group or a complex of something, "a complex of black color", Hispanicized spelling Chiarachiara) is a mountain in the Wansu mountain range in the Andes of Peru, about  high. It is situated in the Cusco Region, Chumbivilcas Province, Santo Tomás District. Ch'iyara Ch'iyara lies northeast of Minasniyuq and Qullpa K'uchu.

References 

Mountains of Cusco Region